Alice Johnson may refer to:

 Alice Johnson (actress) (1860–1914), Broadway actress and singer
 Alice Johnson (zoologist) (1860–1940), English zoologist
 Alice E. Johnson (1862–1936), American architect
 Alice Angeline Johnson (1912–1982), Hawaiian singer and composer
 Alice Johnson (politician) (born 1941), Minnesota politician
 Alice Marie Johnson (born 1955), American drug offender, granted executive clemency in 2018 and later pardoned
 Alice Johnson (A Nightmare on Elm Street), a character in A Nightmare on Elm Street